Let's Rock (known as Keep It Cool in the United Kingdom) is a 1958 rock and roll film starring Julius LaRosa as a crooner attempting to fight off the rival music rock and roll, Phyllis Newman as his songwriting girlfriend who convinces him to adapt rather than fight and Conrad Janis as LaRosa's manager. The film, another rock-exploitation film aimed at the teenage drive-in crowd, was produced and directed by Harry Foster and also features performances from the Tyrones, Paul Anka, Wink Martindale, Roy Hamilton, Danny & the Juniors and the Royal Teens.

Plot
Singer's girlfriend helps him adapt to the new trend of rock'n'roll music.

Cast
 Julius LaRosa as Tommy Adane
 Phyllis Newman as Kathy Abbott
 Conrad Janis as Charlie
 Joy Harmon as Pickup Girl (as Joy Harman)
 Paul Anka as himself
 Danny and the Juniors as Themselves - Performers ('At The Hop')
 Roy Hamilton as himself
 Wink Martindale as himself
 Della Reese as herself
 The Royal Teens as Themselves
 Al DeNittis as Tyrones Saxophonist (as the Tyrones)
 Tyrone DeNittis as himself (as the Tyrones)
 George Lesser as Tyrones Singer (as the Tyrones)
 Paul Sherman as himself / MC
 Harold Gary as Shep Harris

External links 
 
 
 
 

1958 films
1958 drama films
1950s musical drama films
American musical drama films
American rock musicals
American teen drama films
American black-and-white films
Columbia Pictures films
1950s English-language films
1950s American films